Vittorio Saraceno (18th century) was an Italian economist and numismatist.

Works 
 
 
 

Italian economists
18th-century births
Monetary policy
Italian numismatists